Adrien Faviana (born 21 July 1986) is a French professional football player, who currently plays in the Championnat National for Rodez AF.

Career
He played on the professional level in Ligue 1 for OGC Nice and Rodez AF.

Notes

1986 births
Living people
French footballers
Ligue 1 players
OGC Nice players
Rodez AF players
Association football defenders